Abbasabad (also Romanized as ‘Abbāsābād) is a village in Golashkerd Rural District, in the Central District of Faryab County, Kerman Province, Iran. At the 2006 census, its population was 34, in 8 families.

References 

Populated places in Faryab County